Khadak is a 2006 Belgian/Dutch/German film directed by  and . The film is set in the steppes of Mongolia and takes place during winter in the latter half of the 20th century. It explores the events which concern Bagi, a nomadic herder, during his coming of age and the forced relocation of his people.

Bagi has epilepsy and is subject to fits which cause visions and out-of-body experiences. When local officials claim that a disease is killing the livestock his family relies, on Bagi, and many others are forcibly relocated and made to work at an open pit mine mining coal. Eventually, Bagi meets a woman, named Zolzaya, who participates in raids against the freight trains which transport coal away from the facility. As Bagi fights to overcome his epilepsy, together with Zolzaya he leads a group of young people who try to disrupt the mining operations and enliven the despondent populace to return to their nomadic lifestyle.

Cast
Batzul Khayankhyarvaa as Bagi
Tsetsgee Byambaa as Zolzaya
Banzar Damchaa as Grandfather
Tserendarizav Dashnyam as Shamaness	
Dugarsuren Dagvadorj as Mother
Uuriintuya Enkhtaivan as Naraa

Music
Some of the music in this film is composed and performed by the Mongolian band Altan Urag.

Awards
The film won the Lion of The Future – “Luigi De Laurentiis” Award for a Debut Film at the 63rd Venice International Film Festival.

References

External links
 Official website
 Khadak at Internet Movie Database

2006 films
Mongolian-language films